Protector (Pacific Forum)-class small patrol boats are patrol boats built and used by the Hong Kong Police for marine patrols off Hong Kong. They are based on the  built in Australia for several Pacific island nations. Commissioned in 1993, six boats were delivered and in service:

 PL1 51 Protector
 PL2 52 Guardian
 PL3 53 Defender
 PL4 54 Preserver
 PL5 55 Rescuer
 PL6 56 Detector

References
 HK Marine Police

Patrol boat classes
Hong Kong Police Force
Patrol vessels of Australia